Amela Kršo (born 17 April 1991) is a Bosnian professional football striker who currently plays for SFK 2000 in the Bosnia and Herzegovina Women's Premier League and the Bosnia and Herzegovina women's national team.

Club career
Kršo started her career and played years at SFK 2000 in Sarajevo, Bosnia and Herzegovina. She was named Bosnian Women's Premier League Player of the Year in 2011. With SFK, she won six Bosnian women's Premier Leagues and also six Bosnian women's cups.

In 2013 she switched to league rival Banja Luka. After leaving Banja Luka in 2014, Kršo played some months in Hungary for Ferencváros Budapest.

In 2015, she signed for German side Turbine Potsdam. In 2016 she left Potsdam and came back to SFK 2000 where she has been playing ever since.

International career
Since 2009, Kršo has been playing for the Bosnia and Herzegovina women's national team.

Honours

Player
SFK 2000
Bosnian Women's Premier League: 2007–08, 2008–09, 2009–10, 2010–11, 2011–12, 2012–13, 2016–17, 2017–18, 2018–19
Bosnian Women's Cup: 2007–08, 2008–09, 2009–10, 2010–11, 2011–12, 2012–13, 2016–17, 2017–18, 2018–19

Individual
Awards
Bosnian Women's Premier League Player of the Year: 2011

References

External links
Amela Kršo at Soccerpunter

1991 births
Living people
1. FFC Turbine Potsdam players
Bosnia and Herzegovina women's footballers
Bosnia and Herzegovina expatriate sportspeople in Germany
Expatriate women's footballers in Germany
Women's association football forwards
Bosnia and Herzegovina women's international footballers